The men's sprint free competition of the 2015 Winter Universiade was held at the Sporting Centre FIS Štrbské Pleso on January 25.

Results

Qualification

Finals

Quarterfinals

Quarterfinal 1

Quarterfinal 2

Quarterfinal 3

Quarterfinal 4

Quarterfinal 5

Semifinals

Semifinal 1

Semifinal 2

Final

References 

Men's sprint